Herbert Sidney Palmer  (June 15, 1881 – November 28, 1970)  was a Canadian artist. He was best known as a landscape painter who captured Canadian scenes.

Early life and education
Palmer was born in Toronto in 1881. From 1901 to 1905, he studied with Frederick S. Challener and J. W. Beatty at the Central Ontario School of Art in Toronto.

Career
In 1929 he collaborated with the artist Frederick Haines on The Settlement of Canada, an eight-panel mural installed at the Canadian National Exhibition in the Dominion Government Building.

He was a secretary of the Royal Canadian Academy of Arts and the Ontario Society of Artists, and taught at the Ontario College of Art. He was a recipient of the Canadian Centennial Medal, and one of the founders of the Arts and Letters Club of Toronto.

Collections
His work is included in the collections of the National Gallery of Canada and the Art Gallery of Guelph.

References

1881 births
1970 deaths
Canadian male painters
Canadian landscape painters
People from Old Toronto
20th-century Canadian painters
20th-century Canadian male artists
Members of the Royal Canadian Academy of Arts
Academic staff of OCAD University